The Centre for Appropriate Technology Inc (CAT) is an Australian indigenous controlled organisation, based in Alice Springs (Central Australia), which aims to improve the lives of indigenous Australians, using appropriate technology to improve their access to a range services.

It is headquartered in the Desert Knowledge Precinct alongside the Batchelor Institute of Indigenous Tertiary Education.

Bushlight is a division of CAT that builds and maintains renewable energy systems in remote homeland communities. These are generally standalone solar (or solar diesel hybrid) electricity systems.  They are unusual in that there is a complex but user-friendly interface which assists demand management promoting efficient use of the available power.  By 2011 around 120 systems had been installed across northern Australia, while a version of the Bushlight system is being trialled in India.

CAT Projects is an engineering firm based in Alice Springs that is wholly owned by CAT. CAT Projects offers engineering services.

References

External links
The Centre for Appropriate Technology

Appropriate technology organizations
Non-profit organisations based in the Northern Territory
Renewable energy companies of Australia
Organisations serving Indigenous Australians